Peter Bartlett has been the Anglican Bishop of Paraguay since September 2008. Born in 1954 and ordained in 1997, he began his ecclesiastical career  in Bolivia. From 2005 until his elevation to the episcopate he was Team Vicar of  Parr, St Helens in England.

Notes

1954 births
Living people
21st-century Anglican bishops in South America
Anglican bishops of Paraguay